BusKill is an open-source hardware and software project that designs computer kill cords to protect the confidentiality of the system's data from physical theft. The hardware designs are licensed CC-BY-SA and the software is licensed GPLv3. BusKill cables are available commercially from the official website or through authorized distributors.

The name BusKill is an amalgamation of "Bus" from USB and "Kill" from kill cord.

History 

The first computer kill cord was built by Michael Altfield in 2017

The term "BusKill" was coined by Altfield in January 2020 when publishing the first BusKill build and udev usage instructions (Linux-only), and it was ported by cyberkryption from Linux to Windows a couple weeks later. The project's official website launched the following month.

The first OS X version of the BusKill app was released in May 2020 by Steven Johnson.

A cross-platform rewrite of the software based on Kivy was released in August 2020 with support for Linux, OS X, and Windows.

In December 2021, Alt Shift International OÜ ran a crowdfunding campaign to manufacture BusKill cables on Crowd Supply. The campaign raised $18,507 by January 2022.

Hardware 

The BusKill cable is a kill cord that physically tethers a user to their computer with a USB cable.

One end of the cable plugs into a computer. The other end of the cable is a carabiner that attaches to the user.

In the middle of the cable is a magnetic breakaway coupler, to allow the cable to be safely separated at any angle without physically damaging the computer or the user.

A 3D-printable hardware BusKill cable is currently under development.

Software 

The BusKill project maintains a cross-platform GUI app that locks the screen when the cable's connection to the computer is severed and the app is in the "armed" state.

Use 

If the computer is separated from the user, then a magnetic breakaway in the cable causes a USB hotplug removal event to execute a trigger in the app.

The trigger executed by the BusKill cable's removal can lock the screen, shutdown, or securely erase the LUKS header and master encryption keys within a few seconds of the cable's separation.

If combined with full disk encryption, then these triggers can be used to ensure the confidentiality of data or be used as a counter-forensics device.

See also 

 Dead man's switch
 USBKill
 Tails (operating system)
 List of data-erasing software
 List of free and open-source software packages

References

External links
 

Software using the GPL license
Free and open-source software
Free software programmed in Python
Anti-forensic software
Computer security software
Security software
Windows security software
MacOS security software
Linux security software
Cross-platform software
USB